Gaetano Vetturali (1701–1783) was an Italian painter.

Biography
He specialized in imaginary landscapes (capricci) also called paesaggios or veduta (landscapes) with architecture and figures.  Gaetano was born in Lucca. His initial training was in Bologna. He studied first under Giovanni Domenico Brugieri and Giovanni Domenico Lombardi, the former pupil of Maratta and the latter of Marracci. Subsequently he moved on to study quadratura with Ferdinando Galli Bibiena in Bologna, and figure painting with Vittorio Bigari.

He was strongly influenced by Canaletto. In 1759, he decorated the apartment of the Gonfaloniere in the Palazzo della Signoria in Lucca.

References

1701 births
1783 deaths
18th-century Italian painters
Italian male painters
Italian vedutisti
Italian landscape painters
Painters from Lucca
18th-century Italian male artists